Brian Ua Flaithbertaigh, a Chief if the Name and possibly King of Iar Connacht, alive 1117.

Biography

The succession of the chiefs of Muintir Murchada after 1098 is uncertain. It seems that as of 1117, Brian was Chief of the Name. In that year, the annals state that

The battle of Leacain was given by Briain, son of Murchadh Ua Flaithbheartaigh, and the son of Cathal Ua Conchobhair, who had the Connaughtmen along with them, to Toirdhealbhach, son of Diarmaid, and the Dal-gCais, and made a slaughter of them in that battle.

Nowhere is it stated that Brian was King, nor is his obituary given in the years ahead. It may be that he was no more than a successful prince of the clan.

See also

 Ó Flaithbertaigh

References

 West or H-Iar Connaught, Ruaidhrí Ó Flaithbheartaigh, 1684 (published 1846, ed. James Hardiman).
 Origin of the Surname O'Flaherty, Anthony Matthews, Dublin, 1968, p. 40.
 Irish Kings and High-Kings, Francis John Byrne (2001), Dublin: Four Courts Press, 
 Annals of Ulster at CELT: Corpus of Electronic Texts at University College Cork
 Byrne, Francis John (2001), Irish Kings and High-Kings, Dublin: Four Courts Press, 

People from County Galway
Brian
12th-century Irish monarchs